ARA Intrépida (P-85) is the lead ship of the  of the Argentine Navy. It is the lead ship of its class and has a twin sister ship ARA Indómita (P-86). It is the second ship of the Argentina Navy to bear the name Intrépida.

Construction
The ship was ordered in 1970 and built by the Lürssen in Bremen-Vegesack, Germany.

Service history

As of 2021 Intrépida was reported active and participated in a sea exercise with the destroyer Sarandi, the corvettes Espora, Spiro, Robinson and Gómez Roca and with aircraft from Argentine naval aviation. She was again active on exercises in mid-2022.

References 

Intrépida
Ships built in Bremen (state)
1973 ships